Song Seung-hyun (Japanese:ソン•スンヒョン born 21 August 1992) is a South Korean actor and musician. He is best known as a former member of the rock band F.T. Island, where he replaced previous guitarist Oh Won Bin and served as guitarist, vocalist, and songwriter.

Career

2009–2014: Debut with FT Island and solo activities
Song Seung-hyun was a FNC trainee for 3 years before joining F.T. Island. He joined the band as a guitarist and backup vocalist after former member Oh Won Bin left the group. Right after joining FT Island as Oh Won Bin's replacement, "I Believe Myself" became the first single with member Song Seung-Hyun's vocal.

In 2009 Song Seung-hyun appeared on SBS's variety show program Idol Maknae Rebellion ("아이돌 막내반란시대").

He also did a cameo in Style [Ep6] (SBS, 2009)

In 2012 Song Seung-hyun made his musical debut on 'Jack the Ripper' as Daniel. He performed for 8 days in Korea (Korea Haeorum Theater) and 3 days in Japan (Tokyo Aoyama Theater) His character Daniel, is one of the main characters who is part of an extremely sad romance. He begins a dangerous deal for the woman he loves. He was the youngest Daniel to be cast in 'Jack the Ripper'.

2014–present: Continued solo activities and new agency
In January 2014, Song Seung-hyun sang alongside Song Eun-yi forming the duo "Two Song Place", releasing the single "Age-Height"

In 2016, Song was announced to be joining the cast of the web drama 'Detective Alice 2'.

On December 24, 2019, FNC announced that Seung-hyun would depart the group when his contract expires on December 31 to focus on his acting career.

In 2020, Song Seung-hyun signed a new contract with acting agency 'Wooridle Company'.

Other activities

With fellow band member Choi Jong-hoon, Seung hyun modeled at the 2009 Autumn Seoul Fashion Week on 17 October 2009 for Lee Ju Young, the designer of the "Resurrection" collection.
With fellow band member Lee Hongki, Seunghyun becomes ambassadors for Gangwon Province. They introduced Gangwon-do by experiencing the place themselves. They went to Kyungpo Beach, Chamsori Museum, rode on rail bikes as well as the beach train at Jeongdongjin. The series of photoshoot by famous Japanese photographer, Shimokoshi Haruki, portrays the beauty and charm of Gangwon-do.

Filmography

Film

Television series

Web series

Television shows

Musical

References

External links
 
 Song Seung-Hyun Oricon Blog
 

1992 births
Living people
South Korean male idols
FNC Entertainment artists
South Korean pop singers
F.T. Island members
South Korean rock guitarists
School of Performing Arts Seoul alumni
Kyung Hee Cyber University alumni
Musicians from Busan